Tourville is the lead ship of F67 type large high-sea frigates of the French Marine Nationale. The vessel is specialised in anti-submarine warfare, though it also has anti-air and anti-surface capabilities. She is named after the 17th century admiral Count Anne-Hilarion de Cotentin de Tourville.

Between 1994 and 1996, Tourville (and sister ship ) was refitted with the modern SLAMS anti-submarine system, an active Very Low Frequencies sonar.

Career

Varuna 10 
Tourville  was part of the French naval task group led by the  that departed Toulon on 30 October 2010 for a four-month deployment to the Mediterranean Sea, Red Sea, Indian Ocean. and Persian Gulf.

Once on station, the Charles de Gaulle carrier task group joined two U.S. Navy carrier strike groups led by the  aircraft carriers  and  operating in the Persian Gulf. Subsequently, between 7–14 January 2011, the French carrier task group led by Charles de Gaulle participated with bilateral naval exercise, code named Varuna 10, with the Indian Navy. Varuna 10 was a two-phase naval exercise, with the harbour phase taking place between 7–11 January and the sea phase between 11–14 January in the Arabian Sea.

Decommissioning 

Tourville was decommissioned on 9 September 2011 and is now moored in the Penfeld (Brest Arsenal).

Gallery

References

Tourville
Ships built in France
1973 ships